was a Japanese narrator and voice actor from the Tokyo Metropolitan Area. He was the founder of Ōhira Production and was also attached to 81 Produce.

One of his best-known roles was the dub voice of Darth Vader in Star Wars, on the series' home video releases and playing the title character Moguro Fukuzō in the original The Laughing Salesman. He was also known for his many narration roles, most notably in the Super Sentai series.

Overview
Ōhira was a very influential figure in the dubbing industry during the Shōwa period.

After graduating from Tokyo Metropolitan University Jōnan Senior High School (in which he was also the supervisor of the school's volleyball team), he went on to graduate from the Meiji University Department of Political Science and Economics. In 1954, he joined the Nippon Broadcasting System, in which he became an announcer and producer. In 1955, with the opening of the Tokyo Broadcasting System, he enlisted in its theatrical company. He left the company in 1958 to become a voice artist.

His breakthrough performance was the dubbing voice of Darth Vader in the Star Wars series. He reprised this role for Star Wars: Episode III – Revenge of the Sith and a crossover appearance in Soulcalibur IV- notable because the game was originally in Japanese, meaning that Ōhira was Vader's "original" voice in the game, unlike with the films. In addition, he was usually cast in either astringent villain roles or gag characters, such as Pete in Disney cartoons.

He was also a close friend of Kyosen Ōhashi, and the mentor of Shirō Yasutomi.

On April 12, 2016, Ōhira died from pneumonia at the age of 86. As his last will, he requested Tesshō Genda to replace him as the voice of Moguro Fukuzō.

Filmography

Television animation
Oraa Guzura Dado (1967) (Guzura)
The Genie Family (1969) (Hakushon Daimaō)
Science Ninja Team Gatchaman (1972) (Doctor Kozaburo Nambu)
Dash Kappei (1981) (Seiichiro)
Mirai Keisatsu Urashiman (1983) (Gondo)
Osomatsu-kun (1988) (Dekapan)
The Laughing Salesman (1989) (Fukuzō Moguro)
Steal Napoleon's Dictionary! (1991) (Hēkā)
One Piece (2000) (Gaimon)
A Little Snow Fairy Sugar (2001) (Luchino)
PaRappa the Rapper (2001) (Milk Man episode 20)
Basilisk (2005) (Tokugawa Ieyasu)
Save Me! Lollipop (2006) (Grandfather)
Ojarumaru (2009) (Denbo Shijiyourou)

Theatrical animation
The Littlest Warrior (1961) – Mok
Lupin III: The Mystery of Mamo (1978) – Stuckey
Be Forever Yamato (1980) – Führer Skulldard
Cyborg 009: Legend of the Super Galaxy (1980) – Zoa
Doraemon: Nobita and the Winged Braves (2001) – Cyclid
Doraemon: Nobita in the Wan-Nyan Spacetime Odyssey (2004) – President

Video games

Castlevania: Curse of Darkness (Saint Germain)
White Knight Chronicles (Gamarone)

Tokusatsu
Ninja Buttai Gekko (1964) as Narrator
Spectreman (1971) as Chief Kurata
Ambassador Magma (Goa) (body and voice)
Spider-Man (1978-1979) as Narrator
Super Sentai Series
Himitsu Sentai Gorenger (1975-1977) as Narrator
JAKQ Dengekitai (1977) as Narrator
Battle Fever J (Narrator)
Denshi Sentai Denziman (Narrator)
Taiyo Sentai Sun Vulcan (Narrator)
Dai Sentai Goggle Five (Narrator)
Kagaku Sentai Dynaman (Narrator)
Kyōryū Sentai Zyuranger (Narrator)
Chōriki Sentai Ohranger (Emperor Bacchus Wrath (eps. 1 - 16, 18 - 23, 26, 27, 29 - 31, 33, 34, 39 & 40))
Metal Hero Series
Uchuu Keiji Shaider (Narrator)
3 Space Sheriff Special Crossover (Narrator)
Kyojuu Tokusou Juspion (Narrator)
Jikuu Senshi Spielban (Narrator)
Sekai Ninja Sen Jiraiya (Narrator)
Kidou Keiji Jiban (Narrator)

Dubbing roles

Live-action
Telly Savalas (TV Asahi)
Battle of the Bulge
Kelly's Heroes
Capricorn One
A.I. Artificial Intelligence (Teddy)
Adventures in Dinosaur City (Big)
Adventures of Superman (Clark Kent, Superman)
Batman (1992 TBS Dub) (The Joker (Jack Nicholson))
Cats & Dogs (Presiding Judge Dog)
Coogan's Bluff (Lieutenant McElroy (Lee J. Cobb))
Django (1980 TV Tokyo edition) (Major Jackson (Eduardo Fajardo))
Fantasia 2000 (Quincy Jones)
The French Connection (Alain Charnier)
French Connection II (Alain Charnier)
Master of the Flying Guillotine (Fung Sheng Wu Chi)
Mission: Impossible (1999 Fuji TV edition) (The Voice on Tape)
The NeverEnding Story (1987 TV Asahi edition) (Rockbiter (Alan Oppenheimer))
Patton (George S. Patton (George C. Scott))
Project A (Governor-general)
Some Like It Hot (Agent Mulligan (Pat O'Brien))
Superman (Jor-El (Marlon Brando))
Star Wars series (Darth Vader (James Earl Jones); home video versions), Boss Nass (Brian Blessed))
Star Wars: Episode III – Revenge of the Sith

Animation
The Flintstones (Fred Flintstone)
Monsters, Inc. (Henry J. Waternoose)
The Nightmare Before Christmas (Mayor)
Secret Squirrel (Yellow Pinkie)
Space Goofs (Gorgious Klatoo) (Danny Mann))
The Simpsons (Homer Simpson (Dan Castellaneta))
Productions for the Walt Disney Company (Black Pete)
A Goofy Movie
An Extremely Goofy Movie
Disney's House of Mouse

References

External links
Toru Ohira at Ohira Production (Japanese)
 

1929 births
2016 deaths
81 Produce voice actors
Male voice actors from Tokyo
Deaths from pneumonia in Japan
Japanese male voice actors
20th-century Japanese male actors
21st-century Japanese male actors